The Naval Science and Technological Laboratory (NSTL) is an Indian defence laboratory of the Defence Research and Development Organisation (DRDO), located in Visakhapatnam. Its main function is the research and development of underwater weapons and associated systems. NSTL is organized under DRDO's Directorate of Naval R&D. The present director of NSTL is Dr Y. Sreenivas Rao, Outstanding Scientist  and Director General(DG) is Dr. Sameer V. Kamath, Distinguished Scientist .

History 

NSTL was established on  20 August 1969 to undertake research and development of major naval systems and underwater weapons for the Indian Navy to make it self-reliant.

Areas of work 

NSTL is involved in the design, development, testing, evaluation and productionization of underwater weapons and their associated weapon control systems. These include torpedoes, mines, decoys, targets, simulators, Fire Control Systems and weapon launchers.

The lab is also involved in investigating hydrodynamic parameters and structural design of surface and submerged naval platforms and in evolving design criteria through model studies and simulation. NSTL is also involved in developing Warship Technologies, Stealth Technology for ships and Hydro-dynamic research services.

NSTL also develops specialized materials for Marine Applications, including materials for mitigation of Radar, IR, Magnetic, Acoustic and ELFE Signatures leading to stealthier platforms.

Facilities 

NSTL is equipped with laboratories and Hydrodynamic research facilities.

Projects and Products 
 Maareech ATDS
 Autonomous Underwater Vehicle

See also 
 DRDO

References 
http://www.drdo.gov.in/drdo/labs/NSTL/English/index.jsp?pg=Director.jsp

External links 

 

Defence Research and Development Organisation laboratories
Research institutes in Andhra Pradesh
Research and development in India
Education in Visakhapatnam
1969 establishments in Andhra Pradesh
Research institutes established in 1969